Fred K. Abel (July 17, 1903 – August 2, 1980) was an American football blocking back who played one season (1926) with the Milwaukee Badgers of the National Football League. He played college football at the University of Washington. As quarterback for the Huskies in the 1924 Rose Bowl Abel threw a game-tying touchdown that settled the final score at 14-14. Abel attended Montesano High School in Montesano, Washington.

References

External links
Just Sports Stats

1903 births
1980 deaths
Players of American football from Nebraska
American football quarterbacks
American football fullbacks
Washington Huskies football players
Milwaukee Badgers players
Sportspeople from Lincoln, Nebraska